Vincenzo Guerini (born 14 August 1950) is a retired Italian sprinter.

Biography
Between 1971 and 1978 he ran 26 international competitions with the national 4 × 100 m relay team, including the finals of the 1972 and 1976 Olympics, and won five medals. Nationally he faced a strong competition from Pietro Mennea, yet he won the 100 m Italian title in 1972 and 1976.

See also
Italy national relay team

References

External links
 

1950 births
Living people
Italian male sprinters
Olympic athletes of Italy
Athletes (track and field) at the 1972 Summer Olympics
Athletes (track and field) at the 1976 Summer Olympics
European Athletics Championships medalists
Mediterranean Games gold medalists for Italy
Athletes (track and field) at the 1971 Mediterranean Games
Mediterranean Games medalists in athletics
Universiade medalists in athletics (track and field)
Universiade bronze medalists for Italy
Italian Athletics Championships winners
Medalists at the 1973 Summer Universiade
20th-century Italian people